Sir William Fownes, 2nd Baronet (1709 – 5 June 1778) was an Anglo-Irish politician.

Fownes was the son of Sir William Fownes, 1st Baronet, and in 1735 he inherited his father's baronetcy. Fownes was the Member of Parliament for Dingle in the Irish House of Commons between 1749 and 1760, before representing Knocktopher from 1761 to 1776. Fownes was admitted to the Irish Privy Council in 1761. He finally represented Wicklow Borough between 1776 and his death in 1778.

References

1709 births
1778 deaths
18th-century Anglo-Irish people
Baronets in the Baronetage of Ireland
Irish MPs 1727–1760
Irish MPs 1761–1768
Irish MPs 1769–1776
Irish MPs 1776–1783
Members of the Parliament of Ireland (pre-1801) for County Kerry constituencies
Members of the Parliament of Ireland (pre-1801) for County Kilkenny constituencies
Members of the Parliament of Ireland (pre-1801) for County Wicklow constituencies
Members of the Privy Council of Ireland